Nibulon Shipbuilding-Shiprepair Plant (Ukrainian: Суднобудівно-судноремонтний завод «Нібулон») is a Ukrainian shipyard that is located in Mykolaiv owned by agricultural company Nibulon. It is located right next to the Black Sea Shipyard.

History
As an independent company, the enterprise was founded in 1886. The main activity of the company was ship repair. In 1933 the plant began to build barges, floating docks, steel lights and steel structures for waterworks.

In the early 90s, the company began the construction of yachts. There were built two motor-sailing schooner AQUATON-88 (length 26.7 meters), which became the first mega-yachts built in the then USSR. One of these yachts is a training schooner in the naval forces of Spain.

At the same time the yard, with support from the Ukrainian Government, built small fishing vessels for the companies located on the Black Sea and Sea of Azov. At the request of customers who bought old decommissioned military boats, the plant takes care of their repair, modernization and renovation. At the same time the plant is establishing manufacturing and installation of furniture for yachts, including some made of precious wood.

In 1995, the plant was privatized and reorganized into an open joint stock company. It undertook production of sailing and motor sailing yachts and boats.

In 2000, the enterprise was rebranded to Lyman Shipbuilding Plant.

In August 2012, the Nibulon company acquired the assets and property complex of the Liman Shipbuilding Plant. The Nibulon Shipbuilding-Shiprepair Plant was created. In the newly established factory there was reconstruction and modernization of existing facilities for the purpose of construction and maintenance of the trading fleet of the Nibulon company.

On June 10, 2016, Nibulon Shipyard launched the second self-propelled vessel B2000. In general it is planned to build eight vessels of this type. Six of them will be launched on the water by the end of 2016. The vessels will operate in tandem with tugboats.

In 2019, the shipyard built a 10,000-ton NIBULON MAX granary, which become one of the largest ships built in Ukraine for a decade.

In 2020 the company was granted a government contract for manufacturing five OCEA motorboats for the Ministry of Internal Affairs of Ukraine.

See also 

 Nibulon
 Oleksi Vadatoursky

References

Shipbuilding companies of Ukraine
Vehicle manufacturing companies established in 1886
1880s establishments in Ukraine
1886 establishments in the Russian Empire
Buildings and structures in Mykolaiv